Agua Marina Espínola Salinas (born 31 March 1996) is a Paraguayan cyclist, who currently rides for UCI Women's Continental Team .

She qualified for the 2020 Summer Olympics, becoming the first cyclist from her country ever to do so.

Major results

2013
 10th Time trial, Pan American Junior Road Championships
2014
 National Road Championships
1st  Road race
1st  Time trial
 Pan American Junior Road Championships
4th Road race
5th Time trial
2015
 National Road Championships
1st Road race
1st Time trial
2016
 National Road Championships
1st  Road race
1st  Time trial
2019
 8th Time trial, Pan American Road and Track Championships
2020
 National Road Championships
1st  Road race
1st  Time trial

References

External links
 

Living people
1996 births
Paraguayan female cyclists
Sportspeople from Asunción
Cyclists at the 2020 Summer Olympics
Olympic cyclists of Paraguay